Life of Josutty is a 2015 Malayalam-language family drama film directed by Jeethu Joseph. The film stars Dileep in the title role along with a supporting cast consisting of Jyothi Krishna, Rachana Narayanankutty, Renjini Rupesh, Hareesh Perady and Chempil Asokan. Nayanthara made a special appearance as 'Swapna' to whom Josutty finally marries in the climax portion of the movie. The story is formatted with commentaries from the protagonist. The screenplay and dialogue are written by Rajesh Varma. The film is co-produced and released by Eros International, it is their debut production and distribution in Malayalam cinema. Life of Josutty released on 24 September 2015 and met with generally positive reviews.

Plot
Josutty (Dileep) is the son of Joseph and Shoshamma. He belongs to a middle class traditional Christian farmer family in Kattappana, Idukki. As a child he desired to become a priest. But he falls in love with Jessy (Rachana Narayanankutty), his neighbor and childhood friend. Josutty is a sixth standard dropout and from a poor background, the reason why Jessy's dad refuses to marry her off to Josutty. Jessy was ready to go against her father and marry Josutty, but he doesn't want their families to suffer because of them. Later, Jessy married and moved on. Josutty's family was in deep debt and had sister to marry off, yielding to the advice from his friends and relatives he agrees to marry Rose (Jyothi Krishna), a divorcée nurse settled in New Zealand. After the marriage, he travels to Rotorua in New Zealand to join his wife. Upon reaching there, Josutty's life turns upside down. Rose's bipolar character confuses Josutty and later he finds out his wife is pursuing an extramarital life with her former boyfriend. All of a sudden he realizes that he is a "total square" and that everything he believed to be true throughout life was wrong and he vows to make money. His friend Priya and Devassy helps him to run a restaurant and he slowly grows economically. He falls for Priya and works for nine years in New Zealand. He proposes to Priya once but Priya confesses with grief that still her marriage status with her far staying and homosexual husband cannot be changed. After his father's death he goes back to Kattappana facing repressed realities of emptiness in his life from the passing away of his mother, father and close friend. There he meets a door to door sales woman(Nayantara) and marries her and vows to have more children than his first love and neighbor Jessy with the intent to "live life to the fullest".

Cast 

 Dileep as Josutty
 Renjini Rupesh as Priya
 Rachana Narayanankutty as Jessymol
 Jyothi Krishna as Rose
 Chembil Ashokan as Devassy
 Hareesh Peradi as Joseph
 Noby Markose  as Geevarghese
 Vijayakumari as Soshamma
 Aqsa Bhatt as Angel / Devil 
 Krishna Praba as Mollykutty
 Suraj Venjarammoodu as Varkey
 Reshmi Anil as kochu Rani
 Koottickal Jayachandran as Babu
 Saju Navodaya as Rameshan
 Nandu Pothuval as broker Stephen
 P. Balachandran as Peelipose, Jessy's Father
 Santhakumari as Geevarghese's Mother
 Sasi Kalinga as Narayanan Master
 Sunil Sukhada as Fr. Gabriel
 Sudheer Karamana as Mathews
 Jeethu Joseph in a cameo
 Nayanthara as Swapna (Cameo)
  Gaurav Menon as young Josutty
  Nandana Varma as young Jessy

Marketing 
The teaser of Life of Josutty released on 31 August and featured all actors in the film. Eros International's share value surged by 3.98% at the stock market, immediately after the announcement of this film. The trailer of film released on 2 September, telling that there is no twist or suspense in the film. Film's audio is released on 4 September. First video song "Mele Mele" released on 10 September.

Reception

Critical reception
Upon release it received positive critical response. Malayala Manorama rated 3.25 out of 5 stars and concluded "Josutty inspires, and in more ways than one, makes for a good structured story; something that is largely eclipsed by mass entertainers". Rediff.com rated 3 out of 5 stars and called it "impressive" and concluded "On the whole, with Life of Josutty, director Jeethu Joseph carries on his good form that he showed in Drishyam giving Dileep one of the best characters of his career". Bangalore Mirror rated 3.5 out of 5 stars and wrote "It is to Joseph's credit that in today's changing times he has gone ahead and presented us with a simple, slice of life tale, managing to emerge a winner to a large extent". Indiaglitz awarded 3 out of 5 stars and said "Jeethu Joseph has once again come up with a good cinema. The makers' repeated warning that there is no twist of suspense is very much true. Its life - slow and steady like the beat of the heart". Filmibeat.com rated 3 out of 5 stars and said "The movie falls into the slow pace with the excessive load of emotional elements and unnecessary scenes. The climax looks forced; but it may satisfy the audience who insists on a happy ending. But in a whole, Life Of Josutty makes a perfect family movie".

The New Indian Express stated "The film is monotonous till the end. The flow is smooth in the first half which is made interesting with comic sequences. In the second half, it takes more time to narrate the story, hence lags".

Box office

Music 

The soundtrack is composed by Anil Johnson which comprises five songs. The singers include Shreya Ghoshal, Vijay Yesudas, Najim Arshad and Sangeetha Prabhu.

The first video song "Mele Mele"  sung by Shreya Ghoshal was released in September first week. The song shows the transition of Josutty (Dileep) and Jessy (Rachana), from their childhood days to adulthood. It is penned by lyricist Santosh Varma.

Awards and nominations
Filmfare Awards South
 Nominated - Filmfare Award for Best Female Playback Singer – Malayalam -Shreya Ghoshal

References

External links
 
 

2010s Malayalam-language films
Indian family films
Indian drama films
Films shot in Munnar
Films shot in New Zealand
Films set in New Zealand